aecXML (architecture, engineering and construction extensible markup language) is a specific XML markup language which uses Industry Foundation Classes to create a vendor-neutral means to access data generated by building information modeling, BIM.  It is being developed for use in the architecture, engineering, construction and facility management industries, in conjunction with BIM software, and is trademarked by the buildingSMART (the former International Alliance for Interoperability), a council of the National Institute of Building Sciences.

Specific subsets are being developed, namely:
Common Object Schema
Infrastructure
Structural
Facility management
Procurement
Project Management
Plant Operations
Building Environmental Performance

See also
Industry Foundation Classes
BuildingSMART
BIM Collaboration Format

External links
National Institute of Building Sciences (NIBS) buildingSMART Alliance (bSa)
Model Support Group (MSG) of NIBS bSa Responsible for AEC Industry Foundation Class (IFC) Development since ~2006
Links Obsolete by July 2009 at the latest:
North American Chapter of the International Alliance for Interoperability
Proposed common objects - a PDF file

XML markup languages
Building information modeling